Dulmage is a surname. Notable people with the surname include:

Jack Dulmage (1918/19–1998), Canadian sports journalist
Will E. Dulmage (1883–1953), American composer, lyricist, and music publisher